Prasterone enanthate, also known as dehydroepiandrosterone enanthate (DHEA-E) and sold in combination with estradiol valerate under the brand name Gynodian Depot among others, is a weak androgen, estrogen, and neurosteroid medication which is used as a component of menopausal hormone therapy to treat menopausal symptoms in women. It is available only as an injectable preparation in combination with estradiol valerate. The medication is given by injection into muscle typically once every 4 weeks.

Prasterone enanthate is a synthetic androgen, estrogen, and neurosteroid. It is a steroid ester and a long-lasting prodrug of prasterone (dehydroepiandrosterone; DHEA) in the body. Prasterone is a naturally occurring prohormone of androgens and estrogens and hence is an agonist of the androgen and estrogen receptors, the respective biological targets of androgens like testosterone and estrogens like estradiol. Prasterone also has a variety of activities of its own, including neurosteroid and other activities. An injection of prasterone enanthate has a duration of action in terms of elevated prasterone levels of about 18 days.

The combination of estradiol valerate and prasterone enanthate was developed as early as 1966 and was introduced for medical use in 1975. The formulation is marketed widely throughout Europe, and is also available in several Latin American countries and in Egypt. It is not available in any predominantly English-speaking countries.

Medical uses
The combination of estradiol valerate and prasterone enanthate is used in menopausal hormone therapy to treat menopausal symptoms in peri- and postmenopausal women. Estradiol valerate serves as an estrogen in the preparation, while prasterone enanthate is intended to serve as a weak androgen. It is thought that the inclusion of prasterone enanthate in the formulation may provide additional psychotropic benefits.

Available forms

Prasterone enanthate is available only as a combination formulation of 4 mg estradiol valerate and 200 mg prasterone enanthate in oil for depot intramuscular injection.

Side effects

Prasterone enanthate, in combination with estradiol valerate at the dosages used clinically, has no masculinizing side effects. This is in contrast to combinations of estrogens with other androgens, such as testosterone esters.

Pharmacology

Pharmacodynamics

Pharmacokinetics

The pharmacokinetics of prasterone enanthate have been assessed in a number of studies.

Prasterone enanthate is a prodrug of prasterone in the body. It is completely hydrolyzed into prasterone and heptanoic acid (enanthic acid) following absorption from the tissue depot after intramuscular injection.

Levels of DHEA peak at about 9 ng/mL within 1 to 4 days of an injection of prasterone enanthate. Subsequently, DHEA levels return to baseline by about 18 days following the injection. Prasterone enanthate has an elimination half-life of about 9 days. The plasma half-life of DHEA/prasterone enanthate following an intravenous injection is about 44 minutes. The half-lives of DHEA metabolites range up to 3.6 days.

Within 30 days, 91% of a dose of prasterone enanthate is eliminated. Approximately 94% is excreted in urine and 6% in feces. Prasterone enanthate is eliminated mainly in the form of metabolites and conjugates.

Chemistry

Prasterone enanthate, also known as 5-dehydroepiandrosterone 3β-enanthate or as androst-5-en-3β-ol-17-one 3β-heptanoate, is a synthetic androstane steroid and the C3β heptanoate (enanthate) ester of prasterone (5-dehydroepiandrosterone).

History

Prasterone enanthate was patented by Schering in 1968 and 1971. The combination of estradiol valerate and prasterone enanthate was developed and marketed by Schering, was first tested clinically as early as 1966, was first described in the scientific literature in 1972, and was first introduced for medical use in April 1975.

Society and culture

Brand names
The major brand name of the combination of estradiol valerate and prasterone enanthate is Gynodian Depot. Other brand names of this formulation include Binodian Depot, Cidodian Depot, Klimax, and Supligol NF.

Availability
The combination of estradiol valerate and prasterone enanthate is marketed widely throughout Europe, and is also available in several Latin American countries and in Egypt. In Europe, it is available in Austria, the Czech Republic, Germany, Italy, Poland, Russia, Spain, and Switzerland. In Latin America, it is available in Argentina, Chile, Mexico, and Venezuela. The medication is not available in any predominantly English-speaking countries, including the United States, Canada, the United Kingdom, Ireland, Australia, New Zealand, or South Africa.

See also
 Estradiol valerate/prasterone enanthate

References

Androgen esters
Androgens and anabolic steroids
Androstanes
Enanthate esters
GABAA receptor negative allosteric modulators
Neurosteroids
NMDA receptor agonists
Pregnane X receptor agonists
Prodrugs
Sigma agonists
Synthetic estrogens
World Anti-Doping Agency prohibited substances